The American Music Award for Favorite Rap/Hip Hop Band/Duo/Group was awarded since 2003, but was discontinued after 2008. Years reflect the year during which the awards were presented, for works released in the previous year (until 2003 onward, when awards were handed out on November of the same year). The all-time winner in this category is tied between Outkast and The Black Eyed Peas with two wins each. The Black Eyed Peas are the most nominated act with three nominations.

Winners and nominees

2000s

Category facts

Multiple Wins
 2 wins
 The Black Eyed Peas
 Outkast

Multiple Nominations

 3 nominations
 The Black Eyed Peas

 2 nominations
 G-Unit
 Lil Jon and the East Side Boyz
 Outkast
 Three 6 Mafia
 Ying Yang Twins

References

American Music Awards
Hip hop awards
Awards established in 2003
Awards disestablished in 2008